Meritorious Military Pilot of the GDR was the highest honorary title awarded to military pilots of the East German National People's Army. It was given in form of a Medal. Established on August 1, 1974 by the Council of Ministers of the GDR, it was awarded until the dissolution of the GDR in 1990.

Award criteria 
The honorary title could be awarded for:
 Distinguished performance of military pilot compared with:
 Outstanding results in the political and military adjunction as well as
 Outstanding results as to the development of the NPA combat readiness
 Military pilot's performance level: Class I
 No Aviation accident and incident

The number of awarded people was limited to 10 military pilots per year.

Medal description 
The golden medal had the shape of a pentagon with the top below tip, width 31.5 mm and high 41.5 mm. On the lower tip there is to be seen the aircraft emblem of the National People's Army (NPA), a stand on the head flag of the German Democratic Republic (GDR), that is colorful enameled. The biggest part of the medal is occupied by a MiG-23 or MiG-21 that steeply takes off to the sky in front of the bright rising sun.

Left to the aircraft there is a laurel-bough, and right to it the oblique wording  is to be seen. The reverse, however, is empty and glossy.

Different versions have been issued:
 1974–1976: Medal from nonferrous metal gold colored, varnished, size with arched eye 40.5 × 30 mm, reverse glossy. Medal on small medal bar 14 × 25 mm.
 1976–1989: ditto varnished, medal with round eye, on pentagon bar with gibbon bar 14 × 25 mm, reverse glossy, ditto brass-plated, with reverse ornamented.

Wear 
The medal was worn on the left breast suspended from a pentagonal sky blue ribbon of 25 × 14 mm size. The ribbon bar was adequate and showed additionally the golden aircraft emblem of National People's Army of the German Democratic Republic in miniature format.

Recipients (complete list) 
The individuals below were recipients of the honorary title of "Honoured Military Pilot of the GDR".

References 
 Frank Bartel, Auszeichnungen der Deutschen Demokratischen Republik, Berlin 1979
 Auszeichnungen der Nationalen Volksarmee, Berlin 1994
 Orden und Medaillen - Auszeichnungen der DDR, Leipzig 1983

Orders, decorations, and medals of East Germany
Air Forces of the National People's Army
Awards established in 1974
Awards disestablished in 1990
1974 establishments in East Germany